Korang or Koreng may refer to:
 Korang, Rabor, Kerman Province
 Korang, Semnan
 Korang River, Pakistan